Mittu may refer to,

Mittu language, Sudan (extinct)

See also 
 Mittu Khedi, a village in Madhya Pradesh, India
 Mitu (disambiguation)
 Mithu (disambiguation)
 Mitsu (disambiguation)